The 2021 CDC Tour consisted of 12 darts tournaments on the 2021 PDC Pro Tour.

The tournament is exclusively for players from the United States and Canada, with each nation hosting 2 weekends of 3 events, making a total of 12 tournaments. However, with COVID-19 restrictions still in place, separate USA and Canada Tours took place instead of a combined tour. 

The highest ranking player from each nation qualified for the 2022 PDC World Darts Championship.

Prize money
The prize money for CDC Tour events is as follows:

USA Tour

USA Tour 1
USA Tour 1 was contested on Friday 9 July 2021 at the Tampa Westshore Marriott, Tampa, Florida, United States.

USA Tour 2
USA Tour 2 was contested on Saturday 10 July 2021 at the Tampa Westshore Marriott, Tampa, Florida, United States.

USA Tour 3
USA Tour 3 was contested on Sunday 11 July 2021 at the Tampa Westshore Marriott, Tampa, Florida, United States.

USA Tour 4
USA Tour 4 was contested on Friday 17 September 2021 at the Columbia Social Club, Philadelphia, Pennsylvania, United States.

USA Tour 5
USA Tour 5 was contested on Saturday 18 September 2021 at the Columbia Social Club, Philadelphia, Pennsylvania, United States.

USA Tour 6
USA Tour 6 was contested on Sunday 19 September 2021 at the Columbia Social Club, Philadelphia, Pennsylvania, United States.

Canada Tour

Canada Tour 1
Canada Tour 1 was contested on Friday 13 August 2021 at the Days Inn & Suites Moncton, Moncton, New Brunswick, Canada.

Canada Tour 2
Canada Tour 2 was contested on Saturday 14 August 2021 at the Days Inn & Suites Moncton, Moncton, New Brunswick, Canada.

Canada Tour 3
Canada Tour 3 was contested on Sunday 15 August 2021 at the Days Inn & Suites Moncton, Moncton, New Brunswick, Canada.

Canada Tour 4
Canada Tour 4 was contested on Friday 22 October 2021 at the Cambridge Newfoundland Club, Cambridge, Ontario, Canada.

Canada Tour 5
Canada Tour 5 was contested on Saturday 23 October 2021 at the Cambridge Newfoundland Club, Cambridge, Ontario, Canada.

Canada Tour 6
Canada Tour 6 was contested on Sunday 24 October 2021 at the Cambridge Newfoundland Club, Cambridge, Ontario, Canada.

References

2021 in darts
2021 PDC Pro Tour
July 2021 sports events in the United States
August 2021 sports events in Canada
September 2021 sports events in the United States
October 2021 sports events in Canada